Lemyra flaveola is a moth of the family Erebidae. It was described by John Henry Leech in 1899. It is found in western China (Sichuan, Jiangxi).

References

 

flaveola
Moths described in 1899